This is a list of the first women lawyer(s) and judge(s) in New Jersey. It includes the year in which the women were admitted to practice law (in parentheses). Also included are women who achieved other distinctions such becoming the first in their state to graduate from law school or become a political figure.

Firsts in New Jersey's history

Lawyers 

First female: Mary Philbrook (1895)  
 First female to independently defend a client on a homicide charge: Elizabeth Blume Silverstein (1913) 
First African American females: M. Bernadine Johnson Marshall and Martha Belle (1949) 
First undocumented female: Marisol Conde-Hernández (2018)

State judges 

 First female (justice of the peace): Martha Kemble in 1920 
 First female judge: Libby E. Bernstein Sachar (1925) in 1946 
 First female (New Jersey Supreme Court): Marie L. Garibaldi in 1982  
 First African American female: Shirley Tolentino (1971) in 1984 
 First female (Chief Justice; New Jersey Supreme Court): Deborah Poritz (1977) in 1996  
 First female (Superior Court; Assignment Judge): Sybil Moses (1974) in 1997  
 First Latino American female (magistrate): Esther Salas (1981) in 2006  
 First African American female (Superior Court; Assignment Judge): Lisa Thornton (1992) in 2014 
 First African American female (New Jersey Supreme Court): Fabiana Pierre-Louis in 2020 
 First South Asian (female) (municipal court): Dipti Vaid Dedhia in 2022

Federal judges 

 First (African American) female (U.S. District Court for the District of New Jersey): Anne Elise Thompson (1964) in 1979  
 First Hispanic American woman (U.S. District Court for the District of New Jersey; U.S. Magistrate Judge for the District of New Jersey): Esther Salas (1981) in 2006  
 First South Asian American female and first Muslim female (U.S. Magistrate Judge for the District of New Jersey): Rukhsanah L. Singh in 2022

Attorney General of New Jersey 

 First female: Deborah Poritz (1977) from 1994-1996 
First Hispanic American (female): Zulima Farber in 2006 
First African American female: Paula Dow in 2010

Deputy Attorney General 

 First female: June Strelecki in 1957

Assistant Attorney General 

 First female: Marilyn H. Loftus (1961)

United States Attorney 

 First female: Faith S. Hochberg from 1994-1999

Assistant United States Attorneys 

 First (African American) females: Barbara Ann Morris and Carolyn Elizabeth Arch respectively in 1956 and 1966

Public Advocate 

 First female: Zulima Farber from 1992-1994

County Prosecutors 

 First Hispanic American (female): Camelia M. Valdes (2001) in 2009  
First Asian American (female): Grace H. Park in 2013

Political Office 

 First Latino American female (Acting Governor of New Jersey): Zulima Farber in 2006

Bar Associations 

 First female president (New Jersey State Bar Association): Marie L. Garibaldi 
First African American (female) president (New Jersey State Bar Association): Karol Corbin Walker in 2003  
 First Latino American female president (New Jersey State Bar Association): Evelyn Padin in 2018 
First African American (female) president (Federal Bar of New Jersey): Karol Corbin Walker in 2015

Firsts in local history

 Mary Freed: First female magistrate in Atlantic City, New Jersey (1922) [Atlantic County, New Jersey]
 Patricia M. Thompson (1964): Reputed to be the first African American female lawyer in Bergen County, New Jersey
 Sybil Moses (1974): First female judge in Bergen County, New Jersey
 Lois Ely: First female to serve as the Assistant County Prosecutor for Bergen County, New Jersey
 Julie Kim: First Asian American (female) judge in Bergen County, New Jersey
 Lillian Baker (née Dubrow) (1946): First female lawyer in Burlington County, New Jersey
 Ann Schmerling Salsberg (1928): First female lawyer in Camden County, New Jersey
 Mary Ellen Talbott (1963): First female judge in Camden County, New Jersey (1973)
 Judith S. Charny (c. 1984): First female municipal judge in Cherry Hill, New Jersey (Camden County, New Jersey; 2014)
 Kimberly Mutcherson: First African American and openly LGBT female to serve as the Dean for Rutgers Law School (2015)
 Demetrica Todd-Ruiz: First female (and African American female) judge in Vineland, New Jersey [Cumberland County, New Jersey]
 Jennifer Webb-McRae: First African American (female) Prosecutor of Cumberland County, New Jersey (2010)
 Elizabeth Blume Silverstein (1913): First female lawyer in Essex County, New Jersey
 Julie Garcia: First female District Attorney for Essex County, New Jersey (2006-2009)
 Golden E. Johnson (1971): First African American female judge in Newark, New Jersey (Essex County, New Jersey; 1974)
 Myrna Milan: First Hispanic American female judge in Newark, New Jersey [Essex County, New Jersey]
 Joanne Cocchiola: First female municipal court judge in Nutley, New Jersey (2012) [Essex County, New Jersey]
 Lilia L. Munoz: First Hispanic American female (and Hispanic American in general) to serve as the President of the Hudson County Bar Association, New Jersey. She is also the first Hispanic female to serve as the Chief Municipal Court Judge in Union City, New Jersey.
 Carmen M. Garcia: First Hispanic American female to be appointed to the Trenton Municipal Court (1988) and first Hispanic American female Chief Judge of Trenton Municipal Court (2001).
 Esther Beckhoff (1924): First female lawyer in Middlesex County, New Jersey
 Aldona E. Appleton: First female to serve as the President of the Middlesex County Bar Association (1961)
 Renee Anthony: First African American (female) to serve as the President of the Middlesex County Bar Association
 Arlene Quinones-Perez: First female (and Latino American female) to become the City Attorney for Perth Amboy [Middlesex County, New Jersey]
 Florence Forgotson (1927): First female lawyer in Monmouth County, New Jersey
 Lori Linskey: First female to serve as the First Assistant Prosecutor for Monmouth County, New Jersey (2017)
 Rose Danna Ruesch (1935): First female lawyer in Morris County, New Jersey
 Katherine Hayden: First female President of the Morris County Bar Association, New Jersey
 Dorothy Reeve: First female lawyer in Ocean County, New Jersey
 Sadie Pasternack Ranzenhofer (1914): First female lawyer in Passaic County, New Jersey
 LaToyia Jenkins Stewart (2000): First African American female judge in Passaic County, New Jersey
 Linda H. Samson: First female to serve as the President of the Passaic County Bar Association
 Camelia M. Valdes (2001): First Latino American female to serve as the County Prosecutor for Passaic County, New Jersey (2009)
 Sandra Lopez: First Hispanic American female judge in Salem County, New Jersey
 Mary E. Alward (1898): First female lawyer in Union County, New Jersey
 Grace H. Park: First Asian American (and female) to serve as the County Prosecutor of Union County, New Jersey (2013)
 Kelly A. Waters: First female Public Defender for Mountainside and Fanwood. She later became a municipal court judge in the Union Township (2007). [Union County, New Jersey]

See also  

 List of first women lawyers and judges in the United States
 Timeline of women lawyers in the United States
 Women in law

Other topics of interest 

 List of first minority male lawyers and judges in the United States
 List of first minority male lawyers and judges in New Jersey

References 

Lawyers, New Jersey, first
New Jersey, first
Women, New Jersey, first
Women, New Jersey, first
Women in New Jersey
Lawyers, women
New Jersey lawyers